Space colonization (also called space settlement or extraterrestrial colonization) is the use of outer space or celestial bodies other than Earth for permanent habitation or as extraterrestrial territory.

The inhabitation and territorial use of extraterrestrial space has been proposed to be realized by for example building space settlements or extraterrestrial mining enterprises. To date, no permanent space settlement other than temporary space habitats have been set up, nor any extraterrestrial territory or land has been legally claimed.
Making territorial claims in space is prohibited by international space law, defining space as a common heritage. International space law has had the goal to prevent colonial claims and militarization of space, advocating the installation of international regimes to regulate access to and sharing of space, particularly for specific locations such as the limited space of geostationary orbit or the Moon.

Many arguments both for and against space settlement have been made. The two most common in favor of colonization are survival of human civilization and life from Earth in the event of a planetary-scale disaster (natural or human-made), and the availability of additional resources in space that could enable expansion of human society. The most common objections to colonization include concerns that the commodification of the cosmos may be likely to enhance the interests of the already powerful, including major economic and military institutions; enormous opportunity cost as compared to expending the same resources here on Earth; exacerbation of pre-existing detrimental processes such as wars, economic inequality, and environmental degradation.

A space settlement would set a precedent that would raise numerous socio-political questions.  The mere construction of the needed infrastructure presents daunting technological and economic challenges.  Space settlements are generally conceived as providing for nearly all (or all) the needs of larger numbers of humans, in an environment out in space that is very hostile to human life and inaccessible for maintenance and supply from Earth.  It would involve much development of currently primitive technologies, such as controlled ecological life-support systems.  Because of the present cost of sending anything from the surface of the Earth into orbit (around $1400 per kg, or $640 per pound, to low Earth orbit by Falcon Heavy), a space settlement would currently be a massively expensive project. On the technological front, there is ongoing progress in making access to space cheaper (reusable launch systems could reach $20 per kg to orbit), and in creating automated manufacturing and construction techniques.

There are yet no plans for building space settlement by any large-scale organization, either government or private. However, many proposals, speculations, and designs for space settlements have been made through the years, and a considerable number of space colonization advocates and groups are active. Several famous scientists, such as Freeman Dyson, have come out in favor of space settlement.

Definition

The term has been used very broadly, being applied to any permanent human presence, even robotic, particularly along with the term "settlement", being imprecisely applied to any human space habitat, from research stations to self-sustaining communities in space.

The word colony and colonization are terms rooted in colonial history on Earth, making it a human geographic as well as particularly a political term.
This broad use for any permanent human activity and development in space has been criticized, particularly as colonialist and undifferentiated (see below Objections).

In this sense, a colony is a settlement that claims territory and exploits it for the settlers or their metropole. Therefore a human outpost, while possibly a space habitat or even a space settlement, does not automatically constitute a space colony. Though entrepôts like trade factories did often grow into colonies.

History
When the first space flight programs commenced they partly used and have continued to use colonial spaces on Earth, such as places of indigenous peoples at the RAAF Woomera Range Complex, Guiana Space Centre or contemporarily for astronomy at the Mauna Kea telescope.
When orbital spaceflight was achieved in the 1950s colonialism was still a strong international project, e.g. easing the United States to advance its space program and space in general as part of a "New Frontier". But during the initial decades of the space age decolonization also gained again in force producing many newly independent countries. These newly independent countries confronted spacefaring countries, demanding an anti-colonial stance and regulation of space activity when space law was raised and negotiated internationally.
Fears of confrontations because of land grabs and an arms race in space between the few countries with spaceflight capabilities grew and were ultimately shared by the spacefaring countries themselves. This produced the wording of the agreed on international space law, starting with the Outer Space Treaty of 1967, calling space a "province of all mankind" and securing provisions for international regulation and sharing of outer space.

The advent of geostationary satellites raised the case of limited space in outer space. A group of equatorial countries, all of which were countries that were once colonies of colonial empires, but without spaceflight capabilities, signed in 1976 the Bogota Declaration. These countries declared that geostationary orbit is a limited natural resource and belongs to the equatorial countries directly below, seeing it not as part of outer space, humanity's common. Through this the declaration challenged the dominance of geostationary orbit by spacefaring countries through identifying their dominance as imperialistic. Furthermore this dominance in space has foreshadowed threats to the Outer Space Treaty guaranteed accessibility to space, as in the case of space debris which is ever increasing because of a lack of access regulation.

In 1977 finally the first sustained space habitat the Salyut 6 station was put into Earth's orbit. Eventually the first space stations were succeeded by the ISS, today's largest human outpost in space and closest to a space settlement.
Built and operated under a multilateral regime it has become a blueprint for future stations, such as around and possibly on the Moon. An international regime for lunar activity was demanded by the international Moon Treaty, but is currently developed multilaterally as with the Artemis Accords.
The only habitation on a different celestial body so far have been the temporary habitats of the crewed lunar landers.

Conceptual

Early suggestions for future colonizers like Francis Drake and Christoph Columbus to reach the Moon and people consequently living there were made by John Wilkins in A Discourse Concerning a New Planet in the first half of the 17th century.

The first known work on space colonization was the 1869 novella The Brick Moon by Edward Everett Hale, about an inhabited artificial satellite. In 1897 Kurd Lasswitz also wrote about space colonies.

The Russian rocket science pioneer Konstantin Tsiolkovsky foresaw elements of the space community in his book Beyond Planet Earth written about 1900. Tsiolkovsky had his space travelers building greenhouses and raising crops in space. Tsiolkovsky believed that going into space would help perfect human beings, leading to immortality and peace.

In the 1920s John Desmond Bernal, Hermann Oberth, Guido von Pirquet and Herman Noordung further developed the idea. Wernher von Braun contributed his ideas in a 1952 Colliers article. In the 1950s and 1960s, Dandridge M. Cole published his ideas.

Another seminal book on the subject was the book The High Frontier: Human Colonies in Space by Gerard K. O'Neill in 1977 which was followed the same year by Colonies in Space  by T. A. Heppenheimer.

Marianne J. Dyson wrote Home on the Moon; Living on a Space Frontier in 2003; Peter Eckart wrote Lunar Base Handbook in 2006 and then Harrison Schmitt's Return to the Moon written in 2007.

Locations

Location is a frequent point of contention between space colonization advocates. The location of colonization can be on a physical body planet, dwarf planet, natural satellite, or asteroid or orbiting one. Colonization of the Solar System has received the most attention. 

For settlements not on a body see also space habitat.

Near-Earth space

The Moon

The Moon is discussed as a target for colonization, due to its proximity to Earth and lower escape velocity. Abundant ice is trapped in permanently shadowed craters near the poles, which could provide support for the water needs of a lunar colony, though indications that mercury is also similarly trapped there may pose health concerns. Native precious metals, such as gold, silver, and probably platinum, are also concentrated at the lunar poles by electrostatic dust transport. However, the Moon's lack of atmosphere provides no protection from space radiation or meteoroids, so lunar lava tubes have been proposed sites to gain protection. The Moon's low surface gravity is also a concern, as it is unknown whether 1/6g is enough to maintain human health for long periods. Interest in establishing a moonbase has increased in the 21st century as an intermediate to Mars colonization, with such proposals as the Moon Village for research, mining, and trade facilities with permanent habitation.

Lagrange points

The L5 Society was founded to promote settlement by building space stations at these points. Gerard K. O'Neill suggested in 1974 that the L5 point, in particular, could fit several thousands of floating colonies, and would allow easy travel to and from the colonies due to the shallow effective potential at this point.

The inner planets

Mercury 
Once thought to be a volatile-depleted body like the Moon, Mercury is now known to be volatile-rich, surprisingly richer in volatiles than any other terrestrial body in the inner Solar System. The planet also receives six and a half times the solar flux as the Earth/Moon system, making solar energy a very effective energy source; it could be harnessed through orbital solar arrays and beamed to the surface or exported to other planets.

Geologist Stephen Gillett suggested in 1996 that this could make Mercury an ideal place to build and launch solar sail spacecraft, which could launch as folded-up "chunks" by mass driver from Mercury's surface. Once in space, the solar sails would deploy. Solar energy for the mass driver should be easy to come by, and solar sails near Mercury would have 6.5 times the thrust they do near Earth. This could make Mercury an ideal place to acquire materials useful in building hardware to send to (and terraform) Venus. Vast solar collectors could also be built on or near Mercury to produce power for large-scale engineering activities such as laser-pushed light sails to nearby star systems.

As Mercury has essentially no axial tilt, crater floors near its poles lie in eternal darkness, never seeing the Sun. They function as cold traps, trapping volatiles for geological periods. It is estimated that the poles of Mercury contain 1014–1015 kg of water, likely covered by about 5.65×109 m3 of hydrocarbons. This would make agriculture possible. It has been suggested that plant varieties could be developed to take advantage of the high light intensity and the long day of Mercury. The poles do not experience the significant day-night variations the rest of Mercury do, making them the best place on the planet to begin a colony.

Another option is to live underground, where day-night variations would be damped enough that temperatures would stay roughly constant. There are indications that Mercury contains lava tubes, like the Moon and Mars, which would be suitable for this purpose. Underground temperatures in a ring around Mercury's poles can even reach room temperature on Earth, 22±1 °C; and this is achieved at a depths starting from only about 0.7 m. This presence of volatiles and abundance of energy has led Alexander Bolonkin and James Shifflett to consider Mercury preferable to Mars for colonization.

Yet a third option could be to continually move to stay on the night side, as Mercury's 176-day-long day-night cycle means that the terminator travels very slowly.

Because Mercury is very dense, its surface gravity is 0.38g like Mars, even though it is a smaller planet. This would be easier to adjust to than lunar gravity (0.16g), but still present advantages regarding lower escape velocity from the planet. Mercury's proximity gives it advantages over the asteroids and outer planets, and its low synodic period means that launch windows from Earth to Mercury are more frequent than those from Earth to Venus or Mars.

On the downside, a Mercury colony would require significant shielding from radiation and solar flares, and since Mercury is airless, decompression and temperature extremes would be constant risks.

Venus

Surface conditions on Venus are extremely hostile to human life: average surface temperature is 464 °C (hot enough to melt lead), and average surface pressure is 92 times Earth's atmospheric pressure – roughly equivalent to a depth of one kilometre under Earth's oceans. (There is some variation; due to its altitude, the peak of Maxwell Montes is at only 380 °C and 45 bar, making it the coolest and least pressurised location on Venus' surface. There are also some hot spots at about 700 °C.) Solar energy is not available at the surface due to the constant cloud cover, and the carbon dioxide atmosphere is poisonous.

However, the upper atmosphere of Venus has much more Earthlike conditions and has been suggested as a plausible colonization location since at least 1971 by Soviet scientists. At just over 50 km altitude (the cloud tops), atmospheric pressure is roughly equal to that on Earth's surface, and temperatures range from 0–50 °C. The volatile elements necessary for life are present (hydrogen, carbon, nitrogen, oxygen, and sulfur), and above the clouds, solar energy is abundant. Pressurization would not be required; humans could even go outside the habitats safely with oxygen provision and clothing to protect against the sulfuric acid droplets. Geoffrey Landis has pointed out that breathable air is a lifting gas in Venus' atmosphere: a cubic meter of air would lift half a kilogram, and an oxygen- and nitrogen-filled aerostat the size of a city on Venus would be able to lift the mass of a city. This suggests floating aerostat cities as a colonization method for Venus. The lack of pressure differences between the outside and inside means that there is ample time to repair habitat breaches. With just over three times the land area of Earth, there would be space even for a billion such cities. The atmosphere provides enough radiation shielding at this altitude, and Venus' 0.90g gravity is likely sufficient to prevent the negative health effects of microgravity.

A day on Venus is very long on the surface, but the atmosphere rotates much faster than the planet (a phenomenon called superrotation), so a floating habitat would only have a day of about a hundred hours. Landis compares this favorably with polar days and nights on Earth, which are much longer. A floating habitat at higher latitudes on Venus would approach a normal 24-hour cycle. Mining the surface would give access to important industrial metals, and it could be accessed via airplanes, balloons, or fullerene cables meant to withstand high temperatures. To avoid the problem of the habitat being in motion relative to its mining devices, the habitat could descend into the lower atmosphere: this region is hotter, but Landis argues that a large-sized habitat would have enough heat capacity to have no problem with a short stay at higher temperatures.

Mars

Asteroid belt

The asteroid belt has significant overall material available, but it is thinly distributed as it covers a vast region of space. The largest asteroid is Ceres, which at about 940 km in diameter is big enough to be a dwarf planet. The next two largest are Pallas and Vesta, both about 520 km in diameter. Uncrewed supply craft should be practical with little technological advance, even crossing 500 million kilometers of space. The colonists would have a strong interest in assuring their asteroid did not hit Earth or any other body of significant mass, but would have extreme difficulty in moving an asteroid of any size. The orbits of the Earth and most asteroids are very distant from each other in terms of delta-v and the asteroidal bodies have enormous momentum. Rockets or mass drivers can perhaps be installed on asteroids to direct their path into a safe course.

Ceres has readily available water, ammonia, and methane, important for survival, fuel, and possibly terraforming of Mars and Venus. The colony could be established on a surface crater or underground. However, even Ceres only manages a tiny surface gravity of 0.03g, which is not enough to stave off the negative effects of microgravity (though it does make transportation to and from Ceres easier). Either medical treatments or artificial gravity would thus be required. Additionally, colonizing the main asteroid belt would likely require infrastructure to already be present on the Moon and Mars.

Some have suggested that Ceres could act as a main base or hub for asteroid mining. However, Geoffrey A. Landis has pointed out that the asteroid belt is a poor place for an asteroid-mining base if more than one asteroid is to be exploited: the asteroids are not close to each other, and two asteroids chosen at random are quite likely to be on opposite sides from the Sun from each other. He suggests that it would be better to construct such a base on an inner planet, such as Venus: inner planets have higher orbital velocities, making the transfer time to any specific asteroid shorter, and orbit the Sun faster, so that the launch windows to the asteroid are more frequent (a lower synodic period). Thus Venus is closer to the asteroids than Earth or Mars in terms of flight time. Transfer times for the journeys Venus–Ceres and Venus–Vesta are only 1.15 and 0.95 years respectively along minimum-energy trajectories, which is shorter even than Earth–Ceres and Earth–Vesta at 1.29 and 1.08 years respectively.

Moons of outer planets

Human missions to the outer planets would need to arrive quickly due to the effects of space radiation and microgravity along the journey. In 2012, Thomas B. Kerwick wrote that the distance to the outer planets made their human exploration impractical for now, noting that travel times for round trips to Mars were estimated at two years, and that the closest approach of Jupiter to Earth is over ten times farther than the closest approach of Mars to Earth. However, he noted that this could change with "significant advancement on spacecraft design". Nuclear-thermal or nuclear-electric engines have been suggested as a way to make the journey to Jupiter in a reasonable amount of time. The cold would also be a factor, necessitating a robust source of heat energy for spacesuits and bases.

Robert Zubrin has suggested Saturn, Uranus, and Neptune as advantageous locations for colonization because their atmospheres are good sources of fusion fuels, such as deuterium and helium-3. Zubrin suggested that Saturn would be the most important and valuable as it is the closest and has an excellent satellite system. Jupiter's high gravity makes it difficult to extract gases from its atmosphere, and its strong radiation belt makes developing its system difficult. On the other hand, fusion power has yet to be achieved, and fusion power from helium-3 is more difficult to achieve than conventional deuterium–tritium fusion. Jeffrey Van Cleve, Carl Grillmair, and Mark Hanna instead focus on Uranus, because the delta-v required to get helium-3 from the atmosphere into orbit is half that needed for Jupiter, and because Uranus' atmosphere is five times richer in helium than Saturn's.

Jupiter's Galilean moons (Io, Europa, Ganymede, and Callisto) and Saturn's Titan are the only moons that have gravities comparable to Earth's Moon. The Moon has a 0.17g gravity; Io, 0.18g; Europa, 0.13g; Ganymede, 0.15g; Callisto, 0.13g; and Titan, 0.14g. Neptune's Triton has about half the Moon's gravity (0.08g); other round moons provide even less (starting from Uranus' Titania and Oberon at about 0.04g).

Jovian moons

Radiation levels on Io and Europa are extreme, enough to kill unshielded humans within an Earth day. Therefore, only Callisto and perhaps Ganymede could reasonably support a human colony. Callisto orbits outside Jupiter's radiation belt. Ganymede's low latitudes are partially shielded by the moon's magnetic field, though not enough to completely remove the need for radiation shielding. Both of them have available water, silicate rock, and metals that could be mined and used for construction.

Although Io's volcanism and tidal heating constitute valuable resources, exploiting them is probably impractical. Europa is rich in water (its subsurface ocean is expected to contain over twice as much water as all Earth's oceans together) and likely oxygen, but metals and minerals would have to be imported. If alien microbial life exists on Europa, human immune systems may not protect against it. Sufficient radiation shielding might, however, make Europa an interesting location for a research base. The private Artemis Project drafted a plan in 1997 to colonize Europa, involving surface igloos as bases to drill down into the ice and explore the ocean underneath, and suggesting that humans could live in "air pockets" in the ice layer. Ganymede and Callisto are also expected to have internal oceans.

In 2003, NASA performed a study called HOPE (Revolutionary Concepts for Human Outer Planet Exploration) regarding the future exploration of the Solar System. The target chosen was Callisto due to its distance from Jupiter, and thus the planet's harmful radiation. It could be possible to build a surface base that would produce fuel for further exploration of the Solar System. HOPE estimated a round trip time for a crewed mission of about 2–5 years, assuming significant progress in propulsion technologies.

Saturnian moons

Saturn has seven moons large enough to be round: in order of increasing distance from Saturn, they are Mimas, Enceladus, Tethys, Dione, Rhea, Titan, and Iapetus. Titan is the largest and the only one with a Moon-like gravity: it is the only moon in the Solar System to have a dense atmosphere and is rich in carbon-bearing compounds, suggesting it as a colonization target. Titan has water ice and large methane oceans. Robert Zubrin identified Titan as possessing an abundance of all the elements necessary to support life, making Titan perhaps the most advantageous locale in the outer Solar System for colonization.

The small moon Enceladus is also of interest, having a subsurface ocean that is separated from the surface by only tens of meters of ice at the south pole, compared to kilometers of ice separating the ocean from the surface on Europa. Volatile and organic compounds are present there, and the moon's high density for an ice world (1.6 g/cm3) indicates that its core is rich in silicates.

Saturn's radiation belt is much weaker than Jupiter's, so radiation is less of an issue here. Dione, Rhea, Titan, and Iapetus all orbit outside the radiation belt, and Titan's thick atmosphere would adequately shield against cosmic radiation.

Trans-Neptunian region

Freeman Dyson suggested that within a few centuries human civilization will have relocated to the Kuiper belt.

Beyond the Solar System

Looking beyond the Solar System, there are up to several hundred billion potential stars with possible colonization targets. The main difficulty is the vast distances to other stars: roughly a hundred thousand times farther away than the planets in the Solar System. This means that some combination of very high speed (some more-than-fractional percentage of the speed of light), or travel times lasting centuries or millennia, would be required. These speeds are far beyond what current spacecraft propulsion systems can provide.

Space colonization technology could in principle allow human expansion at high, but sub-relativistic speeds, substantially less than the speed of light, c.  An interstellar colony ship would be similar to a space habitat, with the addition of major propulsion capabilities and independent energy generation.

Hypothetical starship concepts proposed both by scientists and in hard science fiction include:
 A generation ship would travel much slower than light, with consequent interstellar trip times of many decades or centuries. The crew would go through generations before the journey was complete, so none of the initial crew would be expected to survive to arrive at the destination, assuming current human lifespans.
 A sleeper ship, where most or all of the crew spend the journey in some form of hibernation or suspended animation, allowing some or all to reach the destination.
 An embryo-carrying interstellar starship (EIS), much smaller than a generation ship or sleeper ship, transporting human embryos or DNA in a frozen or dormant state to the destination. (Obvious biological and psychological problems in birthing, raising, and educating such voyagers, neglected here, may not be fundamental.)
 A nuclear fusion or fission powered ship (e.g. ion drive) of some kind, achieving velocities of up to perhaps 10% c  permitting one-way trips to nearby stars with durations comparable to a human lifetime.
 A Project Orion-ship, a nuclear-powered concept proposed by Freeman Dyson which would use nuclear explosions to propel a starship. A special case of the preceding nuclear rocket concepts, with similar potential velocity capability, but possibly easier technology.
 Laser propulsion concepts, using some form of beaming of power from the Solar System might allow a light-sail or other ship to reach high speeds, comparable to those theoretically attainable by the fusion-powered electric rocket, above. These methods would need some means, such as supplementary nuclear propulsion, to stop at the destination, but a hybrid (light-sail for acceleration, fusion-electric for deceleration) system might be possible.
 Uploaded human minds or artificial intelligence may be transmitted via radio or laser at light speed to interstellar destinations where self-replicating spacecraft have traveled subluminally and set up infrastructure and possibly also brought some minds. Extraterrestrial intelligence might be another viable destination.

The above concepts appear limited to high, but still sub-relativistic speeds, due to fundamental energy and reaction mass considerations, and all would entail trip times which might be enabled by space colonization technology, permitting self-contained habitats with lifetimes of decades to centuries. Yet human interstellar expansion at average speeds of even 0.1% of c  would permit settlement of the entire Galaxy in less than one-half of the Sun's galactic orbital period of ~240,000,000 years, which is comparable to the timescale of other galactic processes. Thus, even if interstellar travel at near relativistic speeds is never feasible (which cannot be determined at this time), the development of space colonization could allow human expansion beyond the Solar System without requiring technological advances that cannot yet be reasonably foreseen. This could greatly improve the chances for the survival of intelligent life over cosmic timescales, given the many natural and human-related hazards that have been widely noted.

If humanity does gain access to a large amount of energy, on the order of the mass-energy of entire planets, it may eventually become feasible to construct Alcubierre drives. These are one of the few methods of superluminal travel which may be possible under current physics. However, it is probable that such a device could never exist, due to the fundamental challenges posed. For more on this see Difficulties of making and using an Alcubierre Drive.

Intergalactic travel
 
The distances between galaxies are on the order of a million times farther than those between the stars, and thus intergalactic colonization would involve voyages of millions of years via special self-sustaining methods.

Law, governance, and sovereignty

Space activity is legally based on the Outer Space Treaty, the main international treaty. But space law has become a larger legal field, which includes other international agreements such as the significantly less ratified Moon Treaty and diverse national laws.

The Outer Space Treaty established the basic ramifications for space activity in article one:"The exploration and use of outer space, including the Moon and other celestial bodies, shall be carried out for the benefit and in the interests of all countries, irrespective of their degree of economic or scientific development, and shall be the province of all mankind."

And continued in article two by stating:"Outer space, including the Moon and other celestial bodies, is not subject to national appropriation by claim of sovereignty, by means of use or occupation, or by any other means."

The development of international space law has revolved much around outer space being defined as common heritage of mankind. The Magna Carta of Space presented by William A. Hyman in 1966 framed outer space explicitly not as terra nullius but as res communis, which subsequently influenced the work of the United Nations Committee on the Peaceful Uses of Outer Space.

Reasons

Survival of human civilization

A primary argument calling for space colonization is the long-term survival of human civilization and terrestrial life. By developing alternative locations off Earth, the planet's species, including humans, could live on in the event of natural or human-made disasters on our own planet.

On two occasions, theoretical physicist and cosmologist Stephen Hawking argued for space colonization as a means of saving humanity. In 2001, Hawking predicted that the human race would become extinct within the next thousand years unless colonies could be established in space. In 2010, he stated that humanity faces two options: either we colonize space within the next two hundred years, or we will face the long-term prospect of extinction.

In 2005, then NASA Administrator Michael Griffin identified space colonization as the ultimate goal of current spaceflight programs, saying:

Louis J. Halle, formerly of the United States Department of State, wrote in Foreign Affairs (Summer 1980) that the colonization of space will protect humanity in the event of global nuclear warfare. The physicist Paul Davies also supports the view that if a planetary catastrophe threatens the survival of the human species on Earth, a self-sufficient colony could "reverse-colonize" Earth and restore human civilization. The author and journalist William E. Burrows and the biochemist Robert Shapiro proposed a private project, the Alliance to Rescue Civilization, with the goal of establishing an off-Earth "backup" of human civilization.

Based on his Copernican principle, J. Richard Gott has estimated that the human race could survive for another 7.8 million years, but it is not likely to ever colonize other planets. However, he expressed a hope to be proven wrong, because "colonizing other worlds is our best chance to hedge our bets and improve the survival prospects of our species".

In a theoretical study from 2019, a group of researchers have pondered the long-term trajectory of human civilization. It is argued that due to Earth's finitude as well as the limited duration of the Solar System, mankind's survival into the far future will very likely require extensive space colonization. This 'astronomical trajectory' of mankind, as it is termed, could come about in four steps: First step, plenty of space colonies could be established at various habitable locations — be it in outer space or on celestial bodies away from Earth – and allowed to remain dependent on support from Earth for a start. In the second step, these colonies could gradually become self-sufficient, enabling them to survive if or when the mother civilization on Earth fails or dies. Third step, the colonies could develop and expand their habitation by themselves on their space stations or celestial bodies, for example via terraforming. In the fourth step, the colonies could self-replicate and establish new colonies further into space, a process that could then repeat itself and continue at an exponential rate throughout the cosmos. However, this astronomical trajectory may not be a lasting one, as it will most likely be interrupted and eventually decline due to resource depletion or straining competition between various human factions, bringing about some 'star wars' scenario.

Vast resources in space

Resources in space, both in materials and energy, are enormous. The Solar System alone has, according to different estimates, enough material and energy to support anywhere from several thousand to over a billion times that of the current Earth-based human population, mostly from the Sun itself.

Asteroid mining will also be a key player in space colonization. Water and materials to make structures and shielding can be easily found in asteroids. Instead of resupplying on Earth, mining and fuel stations need to be established on asteroids to facilitate better space travel. Optical mining is the term NASA uses to describe extracting materials from asteroids. NASA believes by using propellant derived from asteroids for exploration to the moon, Mars, and beyond will save $100 billion. If funding and technology come sooner than estimated, asteroid mining might be possible within a decade.

Although some items of the infrastructure requirements above can already be easily produced on Earth and would therefore not be very valuable as trade items (oxygen, water, base metal ores, silicates, etc.), other high-value items are more abundant, more easily produced, of higher quality, or can only be produced in space. These would provide (over the long-term) a very high return on the initial investment in space infrastructure.

Some of these high-value trade goods include precious metals, gemstones, power, solar cells, ball bearings, semi-conductors, and pharmaceuticals.

The mining and extraction of metals from a small asteroid the size of 3554 Amun or (6178) 1986 DA, both small near-Earth asteroids, would be 30 times as much metal as humans have mined throughout history. A metal asteroid this size would be worth approximately US$20 trillion at 2001 market prices

The main impediments to commercial exploitation of these resources are the very high cost of initial investment, the very long period required for the expected return on those investments (The Eros Project plans a 50-year development), and the fact that the venture has never been carried out before—the high-risk nature of the investment.

Expansion with fewer negative consequences

Expansion of humans and technological progress has usually resulted in some form of environmental devastation, and destruction of ecosystems and their accompanying wildlife. In the past, expansion has often come at the expense of displacing many indigenous peoples, the resulting treatment of these peoples ranging anywhere from encroachment to genocide. Because space has no known life, this need not be a consequence, as some space settlement advocates have pointed out. However, on some bodies of the Solar System, there is the potential for extant native lifeforms and so the negative consequences of space colonization cannot be dismissed.

Counterarguments state that changing only the location but not the logic of exploitation will not create a more sustainable future.

Alleviating overpopulation and resource demand
An argument for space colonization is to mitigate proposed impacts of overpopulation of Earth, such as resource depletion. If the resources of space were opened to use and viable life-supporting habitats were built, Earth would no longer define the limitations of growth. Although many of Earth's resources are non-renewable, off-planet colonies could satisfy the majority of the planet's resource requirements. With the availability of extraterrestrial resources, demand on terrestrial ones would decline. Proponents of this idea include Stephen Hawking and Gerard K. O'Neill.

Others including cosmologist Carl Sagan and science fiction writers Arthur C. Clarke, and Isaac Asimov, have argued that shipping any excess population into space is not a viable solution to human overpopulation. According to Clarke, "the population battle must be fought or won here on Earth". The problem for these authors is not the lack of resources in space (as shown in books such as Mining the Sky), but the physical impracticality of shipping vast numbers of people into space to "solve" overpopulation on Earth.

Other arguments
Advocates for space colonization cite a presumed innate human drive to explore and discover, and call it a quality at the core of progress and thriving civilizations.

Nick Bostrom has argued that from a utilitarian perspective, space colonization should be a chief goal as it would enable a very large population to live for a very long period of time (possibly billions of years), which would produce an enormous amount of utility (or happiness). He claims that it is more important to reduce existential risks to increase the probability of eventual colonization than to accelerate technological development so that space colonization could happen sooner. In his paper, he assumes that the created lives will have positive ethical value despite the problem of suffering.

In a 2001 interview with Freeman Dyson, J. Richard Gott and Sid Goldstein, they were asked for reasons why some humans should live in space. Their answers were:
 Spread life and beauty throughout the universe
 Ensure the survival of our species
 Make money through new forms of space commercialization such as solar-power satellites, asteroid mining, and space manufacturing
 Save the environment of Earth by moving people and industry into space
Biotic ethics is a branch of ethics that values life itself. For biotic ethics, and their extension to space as panbiotic ethics, it is a human purpose to secure and propagate life and to use space to maximize life.

Criticisms 
Space colonization has been seen as a relief to the problem of human overpopulation as early as 1758, and listed as one of Stephen Hawking's reasons for pursuing space exploration. Critics note, however, that a slowdown in population growth rates since the 1980s has alleviated the risk of overpopulation.

Critics also argue that the costs of commercial activity in space are too high to be profitable against Earth-based industries, and hence that it is unlikely to see significant exploitation of space resources in the foreseeable future.

Other objections include concerns that the forthcoming colonization and commodification of the cosmos is likely to enhance the interests of the already powerful, including major economic and military institutions e.g. the large financial institutions, the major aerospace companies and the military–industrial complex, to lead to new wars, and to exacerbate pre-existing exploitation of workers and resources, economic inequality, poverty, social division and marginalization, environmental degradation, and other detrimental processes or institutions.

Additional concerns include creating a culture in which humans are no longer seen as human, but rather as material assets. The issues of human dignity, morality, philosophy, culture, bioethics, and the threat of megalomaniac leaders in these new "societies" would all have to be addressed in order for space colonization to meet the psychological and social needs of people living in isolated colonies.

As an alternative or addendum for the future of the human race, many science fiction writers have focused on the realm of the 'inner-space', that is the computer-aided exploration of the human mind and human consciousness—possibly en route developmentally to a Matrioshka Brain.

Robotic spacecraft are proposed as an alternative to gain many of the same scientific advantages without the limited mission duration and high cost of life support and return transportation involved in human missions.

A corollary to the Fermi paradox—"nobody else is doing it"—is the argument that, because no evidence of alien colonization technology exists, it is statistically unlikely to even be possible to use that same level of technology ourselves.

Colonialism

Space colonization has been discussed as postcolonial continuation of imperialism and colonialism, calling for decolonization instead of colonization. Critics argue that the present politico-legal regimes and their philosophic grounding advantage imperialist development of space and that key decisionmakers in space colonization are often wealthy elites affiliated with private corporations, and that space colonization would primarily appeal to their peers rather than ordinary citizens. Furthermore, it is argued that there is a need for inclusive and democratic participation and implementation of any space exploration, infrastructure or habitation. According to space law expert Michael Dodge, existing space law, such as the Outer Space Treaty, guarantees access to space, but does not enforce social inclusiveness or regulate non-state actors.

Particularly the narrative of the "New Frontier", has been criticized as unreflected continuation of settler colonialism and manifest destiny, continuing the narrative of exploration as fundamental to the assumed human nature. Joon Yun considers space colonization as a solution to human survival and global problems like pollution to be imperialist, as such others have identified space as a new sacrifice zone of colonialism.

Natalie B. Trevino argues that not colonialism but coloniality will be carried into space if not reflected on.

More specifically the advocacy for territorial colonization of Mars opposed to habitation in the atmospheric space of Venus has been called surfacism, a concept similar to Thomas Golds surface chauvinism.

More generally space infrastructure such as the Mauna Kea Observatories have also been criticized and protested against as being colonialist. Guiana Space Centre has also been the site of anti-colonial protests, connecting colonization as an issue on Earth and in space.

In regard to the scenario of extraterrestrial first contact it has been argued that being used to employ colonial language would endanger such first impressions and encounters.

Furthermore spaceflight as a whole and space law more particularly has been criticized as a postcolonial project by being built on a colonial legacy and by not facilitating the sharing of access to space and its benefits, too often allowing spaceflight to be used to sustain colonialism and imperialism, most of all on Earth instead.

Planetary protection

Robotic spacecraft to Mars are required to be sterilized, to have at most 300,000 spores on the exterior of the craft—and more thoroughly sterilized if they contact "special regions" containing water, or it could contaminate life-detection experiments or the planet itself.

It is impossible to sterilize human missions to this level, as humans are host to typically a hundred trillion microorganisms of thousands of species of the human microbiome, and these cannot be removed while preserving the life of the human. Containment seems the only option, but it is a major challenge in the event of a hard landing (i.e. crash). There have been several planetary workshops on this issue, but with no final guidelines for a way forward yet. Human explorers could also inadvertently contaminate Earth if they return to the planet while carrying extraterrestrial microorganisms.

Physical, mental and emotional health risks to colonizers

The health of the humans who may participate in a colonization venture would be subject to increased physical, mental and emotional risks. NASA learned that – without gravity – bones lose minerals, causing osteoporosis. Bone density may decrease by 1% per month, which may lead to a greater risk of osteoporosis-related fractures later in life. Fluid shifts towards to the head may cause vision problems. NASA found that isolation in closed environments aboard the International Space Station led to depression, sleep disorders, and diminished personal interactions, likely due to confined spaces and the monotony and boredom of long space flight. Circadian rhythm may also be susceptible to the effects of space life due to the effects on sleep of disrupted timing of sunset and sunrise. This can lead to exhaustion, as well as other sleep problems such as insomnia, which can reduce their productivity and lead to mental health disorders. High-energy radiation is a health risk that colonizers would face, as radiation in deep space is deadlier than what astronauts face now in low Earth orbit. Metal shielding on space vehicles protects against only 25-30% of space radiation, possibly leaving colonizers exposed to the other 70% of radiation and its short and long-term health complications.

Implementation
Building colonies in space would require access to water, food, space, people, construction materials, energy, transportation, communications, life support, simulated gravity, radiation protection and capital investment. It is likely the colonies would be located near the necessary physical resources. The practice of space architecture seeks to transform spaceflight from a heroic test of human endurance to a normality within the bounds of comfortable experience. As is true of other frontier-opening endeavors, the capital investment necessary for space colonization would probably come from governments, an argument made by John Hickman and Neil deGrasse Tyson.

Life support

In space settlements, a life support system must recycle or import all the nutrients without "crashing." The closest terrestrial analogue to space life support is possibly that of a nuclear submarine. Nuclear submarines use mechanical life support systems to support humans for months without surfacing, and this same basic technology could presumably be employed for space use. However, nuclear submarines run "open loop"—extracting oxygen from seawater, and typically dumping carbon dioxide overboard, although they recycle existing oxygen. Another commonly proposed life-support system is a closed ecological system such as Biosphere 2.

Solutions to health risks 

Although there are many physical, mental, and emotional health risks for future colonizers and pioneers, solutions have been proposed to correct these problems. Mars500, HI-SEAS, and SMART-OP represent efforts to help reduce the effects of loneliness and confinement for long periods of time. Keeping contact with family members, celebrating holidays, and maintaining cultural identities all had an impact on minimizing the deterioration of mental health. There are also health tools in development to help astronauts reduce anxiety, as well as helpful tips to reduce the spread of germs and bacteria in a closed environment. Radiation risk may be reduced for astronauts by frequent monitoring and focusing work away from the shielding on the shuttle. Future space agencies can also ensure that every colonizer would have a mandatory amount of daily exercise to prevent degradation of muscle.

Radiation protection

Cosmic rays and solar flares create a lethal radiation environment in space. In Earth orbit, the Van Allen belts make living above the Earth's atmosphere difficult. To protect life, settlements must be surrounded by sufficient mass to absorb most incoming radiation, unless magnetic or plasma radiation shields were developed.

Passive mass shielding of four metric tons per square meter of surface area will reduce radiation dosage to several mSv or less annually, well below the rate of some populated high natural background areas on Earth. This can be leftover material (slag) from processing lunar soil and asteroids into oxygen, metals, and other useful materials. However, it represents a significant obstacle to manoeuvring vessels with such massive bulk (mobile spacecraft being particularly likely to use less massive active shielding). Inertia would necessitate powerful thrusters to start or stop rotation, or electric motors to spin two massive portions of a vessel in opposite senses. Shielding material can be stationary around a rotating interior.

Psychological adjustment
The monotony and loneliness that comes from a prolonged space mission can leave astronauts susceptible to cabin fever or having a psychotic break. Moreover, lack of sleep, fatigue, and work overload can affect an astronaut's ability to perform well in an environment such as space where every action is critical.

Economics
Space colonization can roughly be said to be possible when the necessary methods of space colonization become cheap enough (such as space access by cheaper launch systems) to meet the cumulative funds that have been gathered for the purpose, in addition to estimated profits from commercial use of space.

Although there are no immediate prospects for the large amounts of money required for space colonization to be available given traditional launch costs, there is some prospect of a radical reduction to launch costs in the 2010s, which would consequently lessen the cost of any efforts in that direction. Advancements currently being developed as part of the SpaceX reusable launch system development program to enable reusable Falcon 9s "could drop the price by an order of magnitude, sparking more space-based enterprise, which in turn would drop the cost of access to space still further through economies of scale." If SpaceX is successful in developing the reusable technology, it would be expected to "have a major impact on the cost of access to space", and change the increasingly competitive market in space launch services.

The President's Commission on Implementation of United States Space Exploration Policy suggested that an inducement prize should be established, perhaps by government, for the achievement of space colonization, for example by offering the prize to the first organization to place humans on the Moon and sustain them for a fixed period before they return to Earth.

Money and currency 
Experts have debated on the possible usage of money and currencies in societies that will be established in space. The Quasi Universal Intergalactic Denomination, or QUID, is a physical currency made from a space-qualified polymer PTFE for inter-planetary travelers. QUID was designed for the foreign exchange company Travelex by scientists from Britain's National Space Centre and the University of Leicester.

Other possibilities include the incorporation of cryptocurrency as the primary form of currency, as suggested by Elon Musk.

Resources

Colonies on the Moon, Mars, asteroids, or the metal-rich planet Mercury, could extract local materials. The Moon is deficient in volatiles such as argon, helium and compounds of carbon, hydrogen and nitrogen. The LCROSS impacter was targeted at the Cabeus crater which was chosen as having a high concentration of water for the Moon. A plume of material erupted in which some water was detected. Mission chief scientist Anthony Colaprete estimated that the Cabeus crater contains material with 1% water or possibly more. Water ice should also be in other permanently shadowed craters near the lunar poles. Although helium is present only in low concentrations on the Moon, where it is deposited into regolith by the solar wind, an estimated million tons of He-3 exists over all. It also has industrially significant oxygen, silicon, and metals such as iron, aluminum, and titanium.

Launching materials from Earth is expensive, so bulk materials for colonies could come from the Moon, a near-Earth object (NEO), Phobos, or Deimos. The benefits of using such sources include: a lower gravitational force, no atmospheric drag on cargo vessels, and no biosphere to damage. Many NEOs contain substantial amounts of metals. Underneath a drier outer crust (much like oil shale), some other NEOs are inactive comets which include billions of tons of water ice and kerogen hydrocarbons, as well as some nitrogen compounds.

Farther out, Jupiter's Trojan asteroids are thought to be rich in water ice and other volatiles.

Recycling of some raw materials would almost certainly be necessary.

Energy
Solar energy in orbit is abundant, reliable, and is commonly used to power satellites today. There is no night in free space, and no clouds or atmosphere to block sunlight. Light intensity obeys an inverse-square law. So the solar energy available at distance d from the Sun is E = 1367/d2 W/m2, where d is measured in astronomical units (AU) and 1367 watts/m2 is the energy available at the distance of Earth's orbit from the Sun, 1 AU.

In the weightlessness and vacuum of space, high temperatures for industrial processes can easily be achieved in solar ovens with huge parabolic reflectors made of metallic foil with very lightweight support structures. Flat mirrors to reflect sunlight around radiation shields into living areas (to avoid line-of-sight access for cosmic rays, or to make the Sun's image appear to move across their "sky") or onto crops are even lighter and easier to build.

Large solar power photovoltaic cell arrays or thermal power plants would be needed to meet the electrical power needs of the settlers' use. In developed parts of Earth, electrical consumption can average 1 kilowatt/person (or roughly 10 megawatt-hours per person per year.) These power plants could be at a short distance from the main structures if wires are used to transmit the power, or much farther away with wireless power transmission.

A major export of the initial space settlement designs was anticipated to be large solar power satellites (SPS) that would use wireless power transmission (phase-locked microwave beams or lasers emitting wavelengths that special solar cells convert with high efficiency) to send power to locations on Earth, or to colonies on the Moon or other locations in space. For locations on Earth, this method of getting power is extremely benign, with zero emissions and far less ground area required per watt than for conventional solar panels. Once these satellites are primarily built from lunar or asteroid-derived materials, the price of SPS electricity could be lower than energy from fossil fuel or nuclear energy; replacing these would have significant benefits such as the elimination of greenhouse gases and nuclear waste from electricity generation.

Transmitting solar energy wirelessly from the Earth to the Moon and back is also an idea proposed for the benefit of space colonization and energy resources. Physicist Dr. David Criswell, who worked for NASA during the Apollo missions, came up with the idea of using power beams to transfer energy from space. These beams, microwaves with a wavelength of about 12 cm, will be almost untouched as they travel through the atmosphere. They can also be aimed at more industrial areas to keep away from humans or animal activities. This will allow for safer and more reliable methods of transferring solar energy.

In 2008, scientists were able to send a 20 watt microwave signal from a mountain in Maui to the island of Hawaii. Since then JAXA and Mitsubishi has teamed up on a $21 billion project in order to place satellites in orbit which could generate up to 1 gigawatt of energy. These are the next advancements being done today in order to make energy be transmitted wirelessly for space-based solar energy.

However, the value of SPS power delivered wirelessly to other locations in space will typically be far higher than to Earth. Otherwise, the means of generating the power would need to be included with these projects and pay the heavy penalty of Earth launch costs. Therefore, other than proposed demonstration projects for power delivered to Earth, the first priority for SPS electricity is likely to be locations in space, such as communications satellites, fuel depots or "orbital tugboat" boosters transferring cargo and passengers between low Earth orbit (LEO) and other orbits such as geosynchronous orbit (GEO), lunar orbit or highly-eccentric Earth orbit (HEEO). The system will also rely on satellites and receiving stations on Earth to convert the energy into electricity. Because of this energy can be transmitted easily from dayside to nightside meaning power is reliable 24/7.

Nuclear power is sometimes proposed for colonies located on the Moon or on Mars, as the supply of solar energy is too discontinuous in these locations; the Moon has nights of two Earth weeks in duration. Mars has nights, relatively high gravity, and an atmosphere featuring large dust storms to cover and degrade solar panels. Also, Mars' greater distance from the Sun (1.52 astronomical units, AU) means that only 1/1.522 or about 43% of the solar energy is available at Mars compared with Earth orbit. Another method would be transmitting energy wirelessly to the lunar or Martian colonies from solar power satellites (SPSs) as described above; the difficulties of generating power in these locations make the relative advantages of SPSs much greater there than for power beamed to locations on Earth. In order to also be able to fulfill the requirements of a Moon base and energy to supply life support, maintenance, communications, and research, a combination of both nuclear and solar energy will be used in the first colonies.

For both solar thermal and nuclear power generation in airless environments, such as the Moon and space, and to a lesser extent the very thin Martian atmosphere, one of the main difficulties is dispersing the inevitable heat generated. This requires fairly large radiator areas.

Self-replication

Space manufacturing could enable self-replication. Some think it's the ultimate goal because it allows an exponential increase in colonies, while eliminating costs to and dependence on Earth. It could be argued that the establishment of such a colony would be Earth's first act of self-replication. Intermediate goals include colonies that expect only information from Earth (science, engineering, entertainment) and colonies that just require periodic supply of light weight objects, such as integrated circuits, medicines, genetic material and tools.

Population size
In 2002, the anthropologist John H. Moore estimated that a population of 150–180 would permit a stable society to exist for 60 to 80 generations—equivalent to 2,000 years.

Assuming a journey of 6,300 years, the astrophysicist Frédéric Marin and the particle physicist Camille Beluffi calculated that the minimum viable population for a generation ship to reach Proxima Centauri would be 98 settlers at the beginning of the mission (then the crew will breed until reaching a stable population of several hundred settlers within the ship) .

In 2020, Jean-Marc Salotti proposed a method to determine the minimum number of settlers to survive on an extraterrestrial world. It is based on the comparison between the required time to perform all activities and the working time of all human resources. For Mars, 110 individuals would be required.

Advocacy

Several private companies have announced plans toward the colonization of Mars. Among entrepreneurs leading the call for space colonization are Elon Musk, Dennis Tito and Bas Lansdorp.

Involved organizations
Organizations that contribute to space colonization include:

 The National Space Society is an organization with the vision of people living and working in thriving communities beyond the Earth. The NSS also maintains an extensive library of full-text articles and books on space settlement.
 The Space Frontier Foundation performs space advocacy including strong free market, capitalist views about space development.
 The Mars Society promotes Robert Zubrin's Mars Direct plan and the settlement of Mars.
 The Space Settlement Institute is searching for ways to make space colonization happen within a lifetime.
 SpaceX is developing extensive spaceflight transportation infrastructure with the express purpose of enabling long-term human settlement of Mars.
 The Space Studies Institute funds the study of outer space settlements, especially O'Neill cylinders.
 The Alliance to Rescue Civilization plans to establish backups of human civilization on the Moon and other locations away from Earth.
 The Artemis Project plans to set up a private lunar surface station.
 The British Interplanetary Society promotes ideas for the exploration and utilization of space, including a Mars colony, future propulsion systems (see Project Daedalus), terraforming, and locating other habitable worlds.
 In June 2013 the BIS began the SPACE project to re-examine Gerard O'Neill's 1970s space colony studies in light of the advances made since then. The progress of this effort were detailed in a special edition of the journal in September 2019.
 Asgardia (nation) – an organization searching to circumvent limitations placed by Outer Space Treaty.
The Cyprus Space Exploration Organisation (CSEO) promotes space exploration and colonization, and fosters collaboration in space.

Terrestrial analogues to space settlement

Many space agencies build testbeds for advanced life support systems, but these are designed for long duration human spaceflight, not permanent colonization.

The most famous attempt to build an analogue to a self-sufficient settlement is Biosphere 2, which attempted to duplicate Earth's biosphere. 
BIOS-3 is another closed ecosystem, completed in 1972 in Krasnoyarsk, Siberia.
The Mars Desert Research Station has a habitat for similar reasons, but the surrounding climate is not strictly inhospitable.
Devon Island Mars Arctic Research Station, can also provide some practice for off-world outpost construction and operation.

In media and fiction
Although established space habitats are a stock element in science fiction stories, fictional works that explore the themes, social or practical, of the settlement and occupation of a habitable world are much rarer.

 Solaris is noted for its critique of space colonization of inhabited planets. At one point, one of the characters says:

In 2022 Rudolph Herzog and Werner Herzog presented an in-depth documentary with Lucianne Walkowicz called Last exit: Space.

See also

 Bernal sphere
 Billionaire space race
 Colonization of Antarctica
 Directed panspermia
 Domed city
 Extraterrestrial liquid water
 Extraterrestrial real estate
 Human outpost
 Human presence in space
 
 
 Mars analog habitat
 Mars One
 Mars to Stay
 Megastructure
 NewSpace
 MELiSSA
 Ocean colonization
 O'Neill Cylinder
 Planetary habitability
 Solar analog
 Space archaeology
 Space habitat
 Politics of outer space
 Space law
 Spome
 Stanford torus
 Terraforming
 Timeline of Solar System exploration
 Underground city

References

Further reading

Papers
 
 
 
 
  Also see 
 
 
 
Video
 Posted on the official YouTube channel of Casina Pio IV.
  Affordable to everyone spaceflight is the key to building a spacefaring civilization. Posted on Vimeo.

 
Science fiction themes
Spaceflight concepts
Open problems
Colonialism